The 2017 College Football All-America Team includes those players of American college football who have been honored by various selector organizations as the best players at their respective positions.  The selector organizations award the "All-America" honor annually following the conclusion of the fall college football season.  The original All-America team was the 1889 College Football All-America Team selected by Caspar Whitney and Walter Camp. The National Collegiate Athletic Bureau, which is the National Collegiate Athletic Association's (NCAA) service bureau, compiled, in 1950, the first list of All-Americans including first-team selections on teams created for a national audience that received national circulation with the intent of recognizing selections made from viewpoints that were nationwide.  Since 1957, College Sports Information Directors of America (CoSIDA) has bestowed Academic All-American recognition on male and female athletes in Divisions I, II, and III of the NCAA as well as National Association of Intercollegiate Athletics athletes, including all NCAA championship sports.

The 2017 College Football All-America Team is composed of the following College Football All-American first teams chosen by the following selector organizations: Associated Press (AP), Football Writers Association of America (FWAA), American Football Coaches Association (AFCA), Walter Camp Foundation (WCFF), The Sporting News (TSN), Sports Illustrated (SI), USA Today (USAT) ESPN, CBS Sports (CBS), College Football News (CFN), Scout.com, Athlon Sports, and Fox Sports (FOX).

Currently, the NCAA compiles consensus all-America teams in the sports of Division I-FBS football and Division I men's basketball using a point system computed from All-America teams named by coaches associations or media sources.  Players are chosen against other players playing at their position only.  To be selected a consensus All-American, players must be chosen to the first team on at least two of the five official selectors as recognized by the NCAA.  Second- and third-team honors are used to break ties.  Players named first-team by all five selectors are deemed unanimous All-Americans. Currently, the NCAA recognizes All-Americans selected by the AP, AFCA, FWAA, TSN, and the WCFF to determine consensus and unanimous All-Americans.

Twenty-seven players were recognized as consensus All-Americans for 2017, 14 of them being unanimous. Unanimous selections are followed by an asterisk (*).

Offense

Quarterback
Baker Mayfield, Oklahoma (AP, AFCA, FWAA, WCFF, TSN, SI, USAT, ESPN, CBS, CFN, Athlon)

Running back
Saquon Barkley, Penn State (AFCA, WCFF)
Bryce Love, Stanford (AP, AFCA, FWAA, WCFF, TSN, SI, USAT, ESPN, CBS, CFN, Athlon)
Rashaad Penny, San Diego State (AP, FWAA, TSN, SI, USAT, ESPN, CBS, CFN, Athlon)

Wide receiver
Michael Gallup, Colorado State (FWAA, WCFF, Athlon)
David Sills V, West Virginia (TSN, SI, CBS)
James Washington, Oklahoma State (AP, AFCA, FWAA, WCFF, TSN, SI, USAT, ESPN, CBS, CFN, Athlon)
Anthony Miller, Memphis (AP, AFCA, USAT, ESPN, CFN, Athlon)

Tight end
Mark Andrews, Oklahoma (AP, AFCA, FWAA, WCFF, TSN, SI, USAT, ESPN, CBS, CFN, Athlon)

Offensive line
Beau Benzschawel, Wisconsin (SI, CFN)
Orlando Brown Jr., Oklahoma (AP, AFCA, FWAA, WCFF, TSN, SI, USAT, ESPN, CBS, CFN, Athlon)
David Edwards, Wisconsin (AFCA)
Will Hernandez, UTEP (USAT)
Mitch Hyatt, Clemson (TSN, ESPN)
Mike McGlinchey, Notre Dame (AP, AFCA, FWAA, WCFF, SI, USAT, CBS, CFN, Athlon)
Quenton Nelson, Notre Dame (AP, AFCA, FWAA, WCFF, TSN, SI, USAT, ESPN, CBS, CFN, Athlon)
Cody O'Connell, Washington State (WCFF, TSN)
Chukwuma Okorafor, Western Michigan (FWAA)
Billy Price, Ohio State (AP, AFCA, FWAA, WCFF, TSN, SI, USAT, ESPN, CFN, Athlon)
Frank Ragnow, Arkansas (CBS)
Braden Smith, Auburn (AP, ESPN, CBS, Athlon)

Defense

Defensive line
Mat Boesen, TCU (SI)
Nick Bosa, Ohio State (AFCA)
Austin Bryant, Clemson (FWAA)
Bradley Chubb, North Carolina State (AP, AFCA, FWAA, WCFF, TSN, SI, USAT, ESPN, CBS, CFN, Athlon)
Clelin Ferrell, Clemson (AP, Athlon)
Maurice Hurst Jr., Michigan (AP, TSN, USAT, ESPN, CBS, Athlon)
Hercules Mata'afa, Washington State (AP, WCFF, TSN, SI, ESPN, CBS, CFN, Athlon)
Ed Oliver, Houston (AFCA, FWAA, WCFF, USAT, ESPN, CBS)
Sutton Smith, Northern Illinois (FWAA, WCFF, USAT, CFN)
Christian Wilkins, Clemson (AFCA, TSN, CFN)

Linebacker
T. J. Edwards, Wisconsin (AP, USAT, ESPN, Athlon)
Rashaan Evans, Alabama, (AFCA)
Jeff Holland, Auburn (SI)
Josey Jewell, Iowa (AP, AFCA, FWAA, WCFF, TSN, SI, USAT, ESPN, CBS, CFN, Athlon)
Micah Kiser, Virginia (TSN)
Joel Lanning, Iowa State (FWAA)
Dorian O'Daniel, Clemson (SI)
Ogbonnia Okoronkwo, Oklahoma (WCFF, CBS)
Roquan Smith, Georgia (AP, AFCA, FWAA, WCFF, TSN, SI, USAT, ESPN, CBS, CFN, Athlon)

Defensive back
Quin Blanding, Virginia (CFN)
Carlton Davis, Auburn (SI)
Jalen Davis, Utah State (WCFF)
DeShon Elliott, Texas (AP, AFCA, FWAA, WCFF, TSN, SI, ESPN, Athlon)
Minkah Fitzpatrick, Alabama (AP, AFCA, FWAA, WCFF, TSN, SI, USAT, ESPN, CBS, CFN, Athlon)
Josh Jackson, Iowa (AP, AFCA, FWAA, WCFF, TSN, SI, USAT, ESPN, CBS, CFN, Athlon)
Derwin James, Florida State (FWAA, USAT, CBS)
Julian Love, Notre Dame (CFN)
Denzel Ward, Ohio State (AP, AFCA, TSN, USAT, ESPN, CBS, Athlon)

Special teams

Kicker
Daniel Carlson, Auburn (AFCA, WCFF, CBS)
Matt Gay, Utah (AP, FWAA, TSN, SI, USAT, ESPN, CFN, Athlon)

Punter
Michael Dickson, Texas (AP, AFCA, FWAA, WCFF, TSN, USAT, ESPN, CBS, Athlon)
J. K. Scott, Alabama (CFN)
Johnny Townsend, Florida (SI)

All-purpose / return specialist
Saquon Barkley, Penn State (AP, FWAA, TSN, SI, ESPN, CBS, Athlon)
Dante Pettis, Washington (AFCA, FWAA, WCFF, TSN, SI, USAT, CFN, Athlon)
Tony Pollard, Memphis (FWAA, WCFF, CFN, Athlon)

See also
 2017 All-ACC football team
 2017 All-SEC football team
 2017 All-Big Ten Conference football team
 2017 All-Big 12 Conference football team
 2017 All-Pac-12 Conference football team

Footnotes

References
Sports Illustrated All-America Team
Walter Camp Football Foundation All-America Team
College Football News All-America Team (Defense)
College Football News All-America Team (Offense)
Associated Press All-America Team. Archived from the original
USA Today All-America Team
Football Writers Association of America All-America Team
2017 ESPN All-America team
Sporting News 2017 college football All-Americans
2017 CBS Sports All-America team
2017 AFCA FBS COACHES’ ALL-AMERICA TEAM
Baker Mayfield, Oklahoma lead college football consensus All-Americans
College Football's 2017 Postseason All-America Team (Athlon Sports)

All-America Team
College Football All-America Teams